A constitutional referendum was held in Switzerland on 31 October 1880 aiming at a complete overhaul of the constitution. The constitutional amendments were rejected by 68.2% of voters and a majority of cantons.

Background
In order to pass, any amendments to the constitution needed a double majority; a majority of the popular vote and majority of the cantons. The decision of each canton was based on the vote in that canton. Full cantons counted as one vote, whilst half cantons counted as half.

Results

References

1880 referendums
1880 in Switzerland
1880
Constitutional referendums in Switzerland